The 2014 Abu Dhabi Grand Prix (formally known as the 2014 Formula 1 Etihad Airways Abu Dhabi Grand Prix) was a Formula One motor race held at the Yas Marina Circuit on 23 November 2014. The race was the nineteenth and final round of the 2014 season, the 916th World Championship race, and marked the sixth running of the Abu Dhabi Grand Prix.

Double points were awarded for the first time at this race. This change to the points system was not well received in the months leading up to the race, and the implementation of this system turned out to be a one-off. The series would revert to the 25–18–15–12–10–8–6–4–2–1 system in use since 2010 for all races, beginning with the 2015 Australian Grand Prix.

The race determined the World Drivers' Championship between Mercedes drivers Nico Rosberg and Lewis Hamilton, with the latter winning both the race and the title. This would prove to be the final Grand Prix for Jean-Éric Vergne, Adrian Sutil and Kamui Kobayashi as well as the last Grand Prix for the Caterham team, which collapsed before the start of the 2015 season.

Report

Background

Changes to points structure
For the first time in the history of Formula One, teams and drivers scored double the number of points awarded for race finish positions. The FIA implemented this in order to maximise focus on the championship until the end of the season. Originally Bernie Ecclestone wanted double points for the last three races of the season, but the teams ultimately decided to have double points for only the last race of the season. The rule change was negatively received by teams and drivers.

As a result of the double points offered for the race, Lewis Hamilton needed to finish in the top two to guarantee the championship. Under the regular points structure he would have only needed to finish sixth to guarantee the title.

Team changes
They had made a last-minute attempt to race in Abu Dhabi, with rumours that they were being sought after by a potential investor. However, those negotiations fell through, ending their chances of making a return to the grid.

Facing a similar financial situation, Caterham launched a crowdsourcing campaign to attend the race, which ultimately proved successful and the team returned for the season-ending race, bringing the grid up to 20 cars. Although Caterham retained Kamui Kobayashi for the race, Marcus Ericsson had terminated his contract with Caterham a week and a half before the race, forcing Caterham to hire another driver. 24 Hours of Le Mans winner André Lotterer, who also drove for Caterham in the 2014 Belgian Grand Prix, was originally linked towards the role, but he turned down the offer. Will Stevens, a former Marussia test driver, took the drive instead and made his Formula One debut. This was also the last race for Caterham as the team collapsed before the start of 2015.

Tyres
For the first time since Pirelli became the sole tyre provider, they supplied the yellow-banded soft tyre as the prime compound, while the red-banded supersoft was the option selection for the event. The previous three seasons saw the medium and soft selections used.

Virtual Safety Car (VSC)
The FIA again tested its Virtual Safety Car system, proposed for the 2015 season, to better deal with race track emergencies following the incident suffered by Jules Bianchi during the 2014 Japanese Grand Prix. The version tested in Abu Dhabi, however, was not preferred to that tested at the preceding United States and Brazilian Grands Prix.

Championship permutations 
The race decided the outcome of the championship battle between Lewis Hamilton (who entered on 334 points) and Nico Rosberg (who entered on 317 points). The champion permutations were as follows:

For Rosberg to win the championship, he would need to:
 Win the race with Hamilton finishing 3rd or lower.
 Come 2nd with Hamilton finishing 6th or lower.
 Come 3rd with Hamilton finishing 7th or lower.
 Come 4th with Hamilton finishing 9th or lower.
 Come 5th with Hamilton finishing 10th or lower.
If none of the previous results happened, the title would be awarded to Hamilton.

Practice
Championship leader Lewis Hamilton topped the first and second practice sessions, while teammate and championship contender Nico Rosberg topped the third and final practice session.

Qualifying
Lewis Hamilton set the fastest time in Q1. He set the fastest time again in Q2, posting a time 0.539 seconds faster than championship rival Nico Rosberg after his teammate had scruffy laps. The situation was reversed in Q3, with Hamilton having two scruffy laps, and Rosberg took pole position with a time of 1:40.480, with Hamilton 0.386 seconds behind in second.

Post-qualifying
Red Bull Racing drivers Sebastian Vettel and Daniel Ricciardo were excluded from qualifying after their cars were found to have front wings that flexed under an aerodynamic load in contravention of the sporting regulations which prohibit movable aerodynamic devices. With their times disallowed, both drivers were relegated to the back of the grid. The team was then forced to change their front wings so as to make their cars legal for the race – a parc fermé violation – and were further penalised, having to start the race from pit lane.

Romain Grosjean received a cumulative series of penalties for exceeding his quota of power unit components, totalling a twenty-place grid penalty. With Grosjean qualifying sixteenth—before Red Bull were excluded—he was unable to serve the full penalty. However, as the race marked the final Grand Prix of the 2014 season, the stewards were unable to carry the penalty over to the 2015 Australian Grand Prix, and so Grosjean was given a pit lane drive-through penalty in lieu of the remaining grid penalty.

Race
Lewis Hamilton got a good start from second on the grid and got ahead of polesitter and championship rival Nico Rosberg by the first corner. At the end of lap 1 Hamilton had a 1.2 second lead over his teammate, which grew to 2.6 seconds by lap 22. On lap 23 Rosberg's troubles began, as he locked up and ran off the track at turn 17 - rejoining 3.9 seconds behind Hamilton - and the following lap he reported he was losing engine power. On lap 25 Rosberg had dropped to 7.1 seconds behind Hamilton, and he was told over the radio that his ERS had failed. Over the following laps Rosberg dropped down the field. Hamilton began to lower his pace - avoiding kerbs and asking his team to keep the engine turned down - in an effort to avoid suffering the same fate as his teammate. This allowed Felipe Massa to make gains on the race leader over the following laps. As Massa emerged from his final stop - putting on the super-soft tyre - he was 11 seconds behind Hamilton, and with fresh tyres he started to close the gap. However it was ultimately not enough, as Hamilton increased his pace by just enough to keep Massa in check. Hamilton crossed the line 2.5 seconds ahead of second-placed Massa to win the race, and with it his second world championship. Valtteri Bottas took the final podium position, giving Williams their first double podium since the 2005 Monaco Grand Prix. Daniel Ricciardo and Sebastian Vettel, who had both started the race from the pit lane, finished in 4th and 8th respectively, after Ricciardo managed to pass Kevin Magnussen early on in the race while Vettel got stuck behind him, which had the knock-on effect of causing him to be stuck behind the Force India cars later in the race.

Rosberg ultimately finished down in 14th, as his car situation got even worse in the closing laps. On lap 53 he was advised over the radio to retire the car, as his chances of scoring any points were effectively over and his car had developed too many problems. However, Rosberg responded by saying he would like to go to the end and finish the race, which he ultimately did.

Post-race
Ahead of the podium ceremony, Nico Rosberg entered into the cooldown room to congratulate championship rival Lewis Hamilton on winning the title. Hamilton later paid tribute to Rosberg for his graciousness in defeat.

Although Rosberg suffered an energy recovery system (ERS) failure and dropped out of the points during the race, he acknowledged that his problem did not make a difference to the championship outcome in the end, as Hamilton would have had to finish 3rd or lower for him to have a chance of winning the title anyway.

Mercedes set two new records, the first being 701 total points, the second being the margin of 296 points to second-placed Red Bull-Renault.

Classification

Qualifying

Notes:
 — Romain Grosjean qualified in sixteenth but was demoted four grid places as part of twenty-place penalty for using his sixth power unit of the season.
 — Daniel Ricciardo and Sebastian Vettel originally qualified in fifth and sixth respectively, but were excluded from the qualifying results and were relegated to the back of the grid for illegal front wings.

Race

Notes:
 — Sebastian Vettel and Daniel Ricciardo were further penalised for having their front wings replaced after qualifying, which violated parc fermé regulations even though the wings were deemed illegal, and were forced to start from the pit lane instead of the back of the grid.

Final Championship standings

Drivers' Championship standings

 Note: Only the top five positions are included for both sets of standings.
 Bold text indicates the 2014 World Champions.

See also 
 2014 Yas Marina GP2 Series round
 2014 Yas Marina GP3 Series round

References

External links

Abu Dhabi
Abu Dhabi Grand Prix
Abu Dhabi Grand Prix
Abu Dhabi Grand Prix